Standard Chinese is the official language of China

Standard Chinese may also refer to:
 Written vernacular Chinese, the standard for written Chinese
 Mandarin (late imperial lingua franca), the spoken standard of the Ming and Qing dynasties
 Mandarin Chinese, the most widely spoken form of dialect on which Standard Chinese is based.